Hartleben is a German surname. Notable people with the surname include:

 Hermine Hartleben (1846–1919), German Egyptologist
 Otto Erich Hartleben (1864–1905), German dramatist, lyricist, and author

German-language surnames